John Martin Thomas (December 27, 1869 – February 26, 1952) was the ninth president of Middlebury College, the ninth president of Penn State, and the twelfth president of Rutgers University.

Biography
Born in Fort Covington, New York, Thomas was an alumnus of Middlebury College, and the Union Theological Seminary. He married Sarah Grace Seely on May 18, 1893, and they had five children.

He served as a pastor at the Arlington Avenue Presbyterian Church in East Orange, New Jersey from 1893 to 1908. In 1908, he was appointed President of Middlebury College. While president of Middlebury, Thomas oversaw the founding of two of its most prestigious institutions, the Middlebury College Language Schools in 1915 and the Bread Loaf School of English in 1920. In addition, he guided a rapid expansion of Middlebury's main campus from four buildings to nine. McCullough Gymnasium (1912) Voter Hall (1913) Mead Chapel (1914), and Hepburn Hall (1917) formed the edges of what is now Middlebury's Main Quadrangle, and Pearson's Hall (1911) became the first building constructed for the women's college. He continued to serve as Middlebury's president until 1921, when he became President of the Pennsylvania State College (now a University). He left Penn State in 1925.

When Thomas was appointed president in 1925, Rutgers was upgraded from a college to a university.  During his tenure, enrollment grew steadily, four year courses in Economics and Business Administration were added to the curriculum, the New Jersey College of Pharmacy was incorporated into the University, and the Bureau of Biochemical and Bacteriology Research was established, in addition to the construction of several new buildings.  Thomas resigned in 1930 due to indecisiveness between the state of New Jersey and university officials over the half-private, half-public role of Rutgers.  Upon his resignation, Thomas assumed a vice-presidency of the National Life Insurance Company in Montpelier, Vermont, became acting president of Norwich University in 1937, and then its president in 1939.

Thomas died in Rutland, Vermont in 1952 at the age of 82.

Sources

 Who Was Who in America. A component volume of Who's Who in American History (Chicago: A.N. Marquis Co.).

External links
 Rutgers biography
 Penn State biography
 

1869 births
1952 deaths
Union Theological Seminary (New York City) alumni
Middlebury College alumni
Presidents of Middlebury College
Presidents of Rutgers University
Presidents of Pennsylvania State University
People from Fort Covington, New York